The Little Darlings can refer to:

Films
 The Little Darling, a 1909 comedy short directed by D. W. Griffith
 Little Darlings, a 1980 American teen comedy-drama film
 Army Brats, 1984 Dutch comedy film

Music
 "Little Darling", a single by Australian rock musician Jimmy Barnes
 "Little Darling (I Need You)", a 1966 single recorded by Marvin Gaye
 "Little Darlin'", a popular song, made famous by the Diamonds

Other uses
 Little Darlings (novel), a 2010 children's novel by Jacqueline Wilson
 Les biches, 1924 ballet choreographed by Nijinska to music by Poulenc